Southern Freeway may refer to:

Southern Freeway, a freeway in New South Wales, Australia, now known as Princes Motorway
Interstate 280 (California), original name Southern Freeway
Tabriz Southern Freeway, Turkey
Second Southern Highway that crosses Ligang Bridge, Taiwan
Southern freeway near Ilz, Styria, Austria
Southern Freeway, early name for the B921 Kinglassie Road, Glenrothes, Scotland